Anthroposophy is a spiritualist movement which was founded in the early 20th century by the esotericist Rudolf Steiner that postulates the existence of an objective, intellectually comprehensible spiritual world, accessible to human experience. Followers of anthroposophy aim to engage in spiritual discovery through a mode of thought independent of sensory experience. While much of anthroposophy is pseudoscientific, proponents claim to present their ideas in a manner that is verifiable by rational discourse and say that they seek precision and clarity comparable to that obtained by scientists investigating the physical world.

Anthroposophy has its roots in German idealism, mystical philosophies, and pseudoscience including racist pseudoscience. Steiner chose the term anthroposophy (from Greek , 'human', and sophia, 'wisdom') to emphasize his philosophy's humanistic orientation. He defined it as "a scientific exploration of the spiritual world", Others have variously called it a "philosophy and cultural movement", a "spiritual movement", a "spiritual science", or "a system of thought". Anthroposophical ideas have been employed in alternative movements in many areas including education (both in Waldorf schools and in the Camphill movement), agriculture, medicine, banking, organizational development, and the arts. The main organization for advocacy of Steiner's ideas, the Anthroposophical Society, is headquartered at the Goetheanum in Dornach, Switzerland.

Anthroposophy's supporters include writers Saul Bellow, and Selma Lagerlöf, painters Piet Mondrian, Wassily Kandinsky and Hilma af Klint, filmmaker Andrei Tarkovsky, child psychiatrist Eva Frommer, music therapist Maria Schüppel, Romuva religious founder Vydūnas, and former president of Georgia Zviad Gamsakhurdia. Though several prominent members of the Nazi Party were supporters of anthroposophy and its movements, including  (an agriculturalist), SS colonel Hermann Schneider, and Gestapo chief Heinrich Müller, anti-Nazis such as Traute Lafrenz, the last survivor of the White Rose resistance movement, were also followers. Rudolf Hess, the adjunct Führer, was a patron of Waldorf schools and a staunch defender of biodynamic agriculture. 

The historian of religion Olav Hammer has termed anthroposophy "the most important esoteric society in European history". Many scientists, physicians, and philosophers, including Michael Shermer, Michael Ruse, Edzard Ernst, David Gorski, and Simon Singh have criticized anthroposophy's application in the areas of medicine, biology, agriculture, and education to be dangerous and pseudoscientific. Some of Steiner's ideas that are unsupported or disproven by modern science, including: racial evolution, clairvoyance (Steiner claimed he was clairvoyant), and the Atlantis myth.

History

The early work of the founder of anthroposophy, Rudolf Steiner, culminated in his Philosophy of Freedom (also translated as The Philosophy of Spiritual Activity and Intuitive Thinking as a Spiritual Path). Here, Steiner developed a concept of free will based on inner experiences, especially those that occur in the creative activity of independent thought.

By the beginning of the twentieth century, Steiner's interests turned almost exclusively to spirituality. His work began to interest others interested in spiritual ideas; among these was the Theosophical Society. From 1900 on, thanks to the positive reception his ideas received from Theosophists, Steiner focused increasingly on his work with the Theosophical Society, becoming the secretary of its section in Germany in 1902. During his leadership, membership increased dramatically, from just a few individuals to sixty-nine lodges.

By 1907, a split between Steiner and the Theosophical Society became apparent. While the Society was oriented toward an Eastern and especially Indian approach, Steiner was trying to develop a path that embraced Christianity and natural science. The split became irrevocable when Annie Besant, then president of the Theosophical Society, presented the child Jiddu Krishnamurti as the reincarnated Christ. Steiner strongly objected and considered any comparison between Krishnamurti and Christ to be nonsense; many years later, Krishnamurti also repudiated the assertion. Steiner's continuing differences with Besant led him to separate from the Theosophical Society Adyar. He was subsequently followed by the great majority of the Theosophical Society's German members, as well as many members of other national sections.

By this time, Steiner had reached considerable stature as a spiritual teacher and expert in the occult. He spoke about what he considered to be his direct experience of the Akashic Records (sometimes called the "Akasha Chronicle"), thought to be a spiritual chronicle of the history, pre-history, and future of the world and mankind.  In a number of works, Steiner described a path of inner development he felt would let anyone attain comparable spiritual experiences. In Steiner's view, sound vision could be developed, in part, by practicing rigorous forms of ethical and cognitive self-discipline, concentration, and meditation. In particular, Steiner believed a person's spiritual development could occur only after a period of moral development.

In 1912, Steiner broke away from the Theosophical Society to found an independent group, which he named the Anthroposophical Society. After World War I, members of the young society began applying Steiner's ideas to create cultural movements in areas such as traditional and special education, farming, and medicine.

By 1923, a schism had formed between older members, focused on inner development, and younger members eager to become active in contemporary social transformations. In response, Steiner attempted to bridge the gap by establishing an overall School for Spiritual Science. As a spiritual basis for the reborn movement, Steiner wrote a Foundation Stone Meditation which remains a central touchstone of anthroposophical ideas.

Steiner died just over a year later, in 1925. The Second World War temporarily hindered the anthroposophical movement in most of Continental Europe, as the Anthroposophical Society and most of its practical counter-cultural applications were banned by the Nazi government. Though at least one prominent member of the Nazi Party, Rudolf Hess, was a strong supporter of anthroposophy, very few anthroposophists belonged to the National Socialist Party. In reality, Steiner had both enemies and loyal supporters in the upper echelons of the Nazi regime. Staudenmaier speaks of the "polycratic party-state apparatus", so Nazism's approach to Anthroposophy was not characterized by monolithic ideological unity. When Hess defected to UK, their most powerful protector was gone, but Anthroposophists were still not left without supporters among higher-placed Nazis.

The Third Reich had banned almost all esoteric organizations, pretending that these are controlled by Jews. The truth was that while Anthroposophists complained of bad press, they were to a surprising extent let be by the Nazi regime, "including outspokenly supportive pieces in the Völkischer Beobachter". Ideological purists from Sicherheitsdienst argued largely in vain against Anthroposophy. According to Staudenmaier, "The prospect of unmitigated persecution was held at bay for years in a tenuous truce between pro-anthroposophical and anti-anthroposophical Nazi factions."

According to  Hans Büchenbacher, an anthroposophist, the Secretary General of the General Anthroposophical Society, Guenther Wachsmuth,  as well as Steiner's widow, Marie Steiner, were “completely pro-Nazi.” Marie Steiner-von Sivers, Guenther Wachsmuth, and Albert Steffen, had publicly expressed sympathy for the Nazi regime since its beginnings; led by such sympathies of their leadership, the Swiss and German Anthroposophical organizations chose for a path conflating accommodation with collaboration, which in the end ensured that while the Nazi regime hunted the esoteric organizations, Gentile Anthroposophists from Nazi Germany and countries occupied by it were let be to a surprising extent. Of course they had some setbacks from the enemies of Anthroposophy among the upper echelons of the Nazi regime, but Anthroposophists also had loyal supporters among them, so overall Gentile Anthroposophists were not badly hit by the Nazi regime.

By 2007, national branches of the Anthroposophical Society had been established in fifty countries and about 10,000 institutions around the world were working on the basis of anthroposophical ideas.

Etymology and earlier uses of the word
An early English usage is recorded by Nathan Bailey (1742) as meaning "the knowledge of the nature of man."

The first known use of the term anthroposophy occurs within Arbatel de magia veterum, summum sapientiae studium, a book published anonymously in 1575 and attributed to Heinrich Cornelius Agrippa. The work describes anthroposophy (as well as theosophy) variously as an understanding of goodness, nature, or human affairs. In 1648, the Welsh philosopher Thomas Vaughan published his Anthroposophia Theomagica, or a discourse of the nature of man and his state after death.

The term began to appear with some frequency in philosophical works of the mid- and late-nineteenth century. In the early part of that century, Ignaz Troxler used the term anthroposophy to refer to philosophy deepened to self-knowledge, which he suggested allows deeper knowledge of nature as well. He spoke of human nature as a mystical unity of God and world. Immanuel Hermann Fichte used the term anthroposophy to refer to "rigorous human self-knowledge," achievable through thorough comprehension of the human spirit and of the working of God in this spirit, in his 1856 work Anthropology: The Study of the Human Soul. In 1872, the philosopher of religion Gideon Spicker used the term anthroposophy to refer to self-knowledge that would unite God and world: "the true study of the human being is the human being, and philosophy's highest aim is self-knowledge, or Anthroposophy."

In 1882, the philosopher Robert Zimmermann published the treatise, "An Outline of Anthroposophy: Proposal for a System of Idealism on a Realistic Basis," proposing that idealistic philosophy should employ logical thinking to extend empirical experience. Steiner attended lectures by Zimmermann at the University of Vienna in the early 1880s, thus at the time of this book's publication.

In the early 1900s, Steiner began using the term anthroposophy (i.e. human wisdom) as an alternative to the term theosophy (i.e. divine wisdom).

Central ideas

Spiritual knowledge and freedom
Anthroposophical proponents aim to extend the clarity of the scientific method to phenomena of human soul-life and spiritual experiences. Steiner believed this required developing new faculties of objective spiritual perception, which he maintained was still possible for contemporary humans. The steps of this process of inner development he identified as consciously achieved imagination, inspiration, and intuition. Steiner believed results of this form of spiritual research should be expressed in a way that can be understood and evaluated on the same basis as the results of natural science.

Steiner hoped to form a spiritual movement that would free the individual from any external authority. For Steiner, the human capacity for rational thought would allow individuals to comprehend spiritual research on their own and bypass the danger of dependency on an authority such as himself.

Steiner contrasted the anthroposophical approach with both conventional mysticism, which he considered lacking the clarity necessary for exact knowledge, and natural science, which he considered arbitrarily limited to what can be seen, heard, or felt with the outward senses.

Nature of the human being

In Theosophy, Steiner suggested that human beings unite a physical body of substances gathered from and returning to the inorganic world; a life body (also called the etheric body), in common with all living creatures (including plants); a bearer of sentience or consciousness (also called the astral body), in common with all animals; and the ego, which anchors the faculty of self-awareness unique to human beings.

Anthroposophy describes a broad evolution of human consciousness. Early stages of human evolution possess an intuitive perception of reality, including a clairvoyant perception of spiritual realities. Humanity has progressively evolved an increasing reliance on intellectual faculties and a corresponding loss of intuitive or clairvoyant experiences, which have become atavistic. The increasing intellectualization of consciousness, initially a progressive direction of evolution, has led to an excessive reliance on abstraction and a loss of contact with both natural and spiritual realities. However, to go further requires new capacities that combine the clarity of intellectual thought with the imagination and with consciously achieved inspiration and intuitive insights.

Anthroposophy speaks of the reincarnation of the human spirit: that the human being passes between stages of existence, incarnating into an earthly body, living on earth, leaving the body behind, and entering into the spiritual worlds before returning to be born again into a new life on earth. After the death of the physical body, the human spirit recapitulates the past life, perceiving its events as they were experienced by the objects of its actions. A complex transformation takes place between the review of the past life and the preparation for the next life. The individual's karmic condition eventually leads to a choice of parents, physical body, disposition, and capacities that provide the challenges and opportunities that further development requires, which includes karmically chosen tasks for the future life.

Steiner described some conditions that determine the interdependence of a person's lives, or karma.

Evolution
The anthroposophical view of evolution considers all animals to have evolved from an early, unspecialized form. As the least specialized animal, human beings have maintained the closest connection to the archetypal form; contrary to the Darwinian conception of human evolution, all other animals devolve from this archetype. The spiritual archetype originally created by spiritual beings was devoid of physical substance; only later did this descend into material existence on Earth. In this view, human evolution has accompanied the Earth's evolution throughout the existence of the Earth.

Anthroposophy adapted Theosophy's complex system of cycles of world development and human evolution. The evolution of the world is said to have occurred in cycles. The first phase of the world consisted only of heat. In the second phase, a more active condition, light, and a more condensed, gaseous state separate out from the heat. In the third phase, a fluid state arose, as well as a sounding, forming energy. In the fourth (current) phase, solid physical matter first exists. This process is said to have been accompanied by an evolution of consciousness which led up to present human culture.

Ethics
The anthroposophical view is that good is found in the balance between two polar influences on world and human evolution. These are often described through their mythological embodiments as spiritual adversaries which endeavour to tempt and corrupt humanity, Lucifer and his counterpart Ahriman. These have both positive and negative aspects. Lucifer is the light spirit, which "plays on human pride and offers the delusion of divinity", but also motivates creativity and spirituality; Ahriman is the dark spirit that tempts human beings to "...deny [their] link with divinity and to live entirely on the material plane", but that also stimulates intellectuality and technology. Both figures exert a negative effect on humanity when their influence becomes misplaced or one-sided, yet their influences are necessary for human freedom to unfold.

Each human being has the task to find a balance between these opposing influences, and each is helped in this task by the mediation of the Representative of Humanity, also known as the Christ being, a spiritual entity who stands between and harmonizes the two extremes.

Claimed applications

Steiner/Waldorf education

This is a pedagogical movement with over 1000 Steiner or Waldorf schools (the latter name stems from the first such school, founded in Stuttgart in 1919) located in some 60 countries; the great majority of these are independent (private) schools. Sixteen of the schools have been affiliated with the United Nations' UNESCO Associated Schools Project Network, which sponsors education projects that foster improved quality of education throughout the world. Waldorf schools receive full or partial governmental funding in some European nations, Australia and in parts of the United States (as Waldorf method public or charter schools) and Canada.

The schools have been founded in a variety of communities: for example in the favelas of São Paulo to wealthy suburbs of major cities; in India, Egypt,  Australia, the Netherlands, Mexico and South Africa. Though most of the early Waldorf schools were teacher-founded, the schools today are usually initiated and later supported by a parent community. Waldorf schools are among the most visible anthroposophical institutions.

Biodynamic agriculture

Biodynamic agriculture,  is a form of alternative agriculture based on pseudo-scientific and esoteric concepts.  It is also the first intentional form of organic farming, began in 1924, when Rudolf Steiner gave a series of lectures published in English as The Agriculture Course. Steiner is considered one of the founders of the modern organic farming movement.

Anthroposophical medicine

Anthroposophical medicine is a form of alternative medicine based on pseudoscientific and occult notions rather than in science-based medicine.

Most anthroposophic medical preparations are highly diluted, like homeopathic remedies, while  harmless in of themselves, using them in place of conventional medicine to treat illness is ineffective and risks adverse consequences.

One of the most studied applications has been the use of mistletoe extracts in cancer therapy, but research has found no evidence of benefit.

Special needs education and services
 
In 1922, Ita Wegman founded an anthroposophical center for special needs education, the Sonnenhof, in Switzerland. In 1940, Karl König founded the Camphill Movement in Scotland. The latter in particular has spread widely, and there are now over a hundred Camphill communities and other anthroposophical homes for children and adults in need of special care in about 22 countries around the world. Both Karl König, Thomas Weihs and others have written extensively on these ideas underlying Special education.

Architecture

Steiner designed around thirteen buildings in an organic—expressionist architectural style. Foremost among these are his designs for the two Goetheanum buildings in Dornach, Switzerland. Thousands of further buildings have been built by later generations of anthroposophic architects.

Architects who have been strongly influenced by the anthroposophic style include Imre Makovecz in Hungary, Hans Scharoun and Joachim Eble in Germany, Erik Asmussen in Sweden,  Kenji Imai in Japan, Thomas Rau, Anton Alberts and Max van Huut in the Netherlands, Christopher Day and Camphill Architects in the UK, Thompson and Rose in America, Denis Bowman in Canada, and Walter Burley Griffin and Gregory Burgess in Australia.<ref>Raab, Klingborg and Fånt, Eloquent Concrete, London: 1979.</ref>Sokolina, Anna, "The Goetheanum Culture in Modern Architecture." In: Science, Education and Experimental Design (Nauka, obrazovaniie i eksperimental'noie proiektirovaniie. Trudy MARKHI) (In Russian), edited by D.O. Shvidkovsky, G.V. Yesaulov, et al., 157-159. Moscow: MARKHI, 2014. 536p.
ING House in Amsterdam is a contemporary building by an anthroposophical architect which has received awards for its ecological design and approach to a self-sustaining ecology as an autonomous building and example of sustainable architecture.

Eurythmy

Together with Marie von Sivers, Steiner developed eurythmy, a performance art combining dance, speech, and music.Earl j. Ogletree, Eurythmy: A therapeutic art of movement  Journal of Special Education Fall 1976 vol. 10 no. 3 305-319  

Social finance and entrepreneurship

Around the world today are a number of banks, companies, charities, and schools for developing co-operative forms of business using Steiner's ideas about economic associations, aiming at harmonious and socially responsible roles in the world economy. The first anthroposophic bank was the Gemeinschaftsbank für Leihen und Schenken in Bochum, Germany, founded in 1974.
Socially responsible banks founded out of anthroposophy include Triodos Bank, founded in the Netherlands in 1980 and also active in the UK, Germany, Belgium, Spain and France. Other examples include Cultura Sparebank which dates from 1982 when a group of Norwegian anthroposophists began an initiative for ethical banking but only began to operate as a savings bank in Norway in the late 90s, La Nef in France and RSF Social Financein San Francisco.

Harvard Business School historian Geoffrey Jones traced the considerable impact both Steiner and later anthroposophical entrepreneurs had on the creation of many businesses in organic food, ecological architecture and sustainable finance.

Organizational development, counselling and biography work
Bernard Lievegoed, a psychiatrist, founded a new method of individual and institutional development oriented towards humanizing organizations and linked with Steiner's ideas of the threefold social order. This work is represented by the NPI Institute for Organizational Development in the Netherlands and sister organizations in many other countries. Various forms of biographic and counselling work have been developed on the basis of anthroposophy.

Speech and drama
There are also anthroposophical movements to renew speech and drama, the most important of which are based in the work of Marie Steiner-von Sivers (speech formation, also known as Creative Speech) and the Chekhov Method originated by Michael Chekhov (nephew of Anton Chekhov).

Art

Anthroposophic painting, a style inspired by Rudolf Steiner, featured prominently in the first Goetheanum's cupola. The technique frequently begins by filling the surface to be painted with color, out of which forms are gradually developed, often images with symbolic-spiritual significance. Paints that allow for many transparent layers are preferred, and often these are derived from plant materials. Rudolf Steiner appointed the English sculptor Edith Maryon as head of the School of Fine Art at the Goetheanum. Together they carved the 9-metre tall sculpture titled The Representative of Humanity, on display at the Goetheanum.

Other
Phenomenological approaches to science, pseudo-scientific ideas based on Goethe's philosophy of nature.
New approaches to painting and sculpture.
John Wilkes' fountain-like flowforms, sculptural forms that guide water into rhythmic movement for the purposes of decoration.

Social goals

For a period after World War I, Steiner was extremely active and well known in Germany, in part because he lectured widely proposing social reforms. Steiner was a sharp critic of nationalism, which he saw as outdated, and a proponent of achieving social solidarity through individual freedom. A petition proposing a radical change in the German constitution and expressing his basic social ideas (signed by Herman Hesse, among others) was widely circulated. His main book on social reform is Toward Social Renewal.

Anthroposophy continues to aim at reforming society through maintaining and strengthening the independence of the spheres of cultural life, human rights and the economy. It emphasizes a particular ideal in each of these three realms of society:
 Liberty in cultural life
 Equality of rights, the sphere of legislation
 Fraternity in the economic sphere

Esoteric path

Paths of spiritual development
According to Steiner, a real spiritual world exists, evolving along with the material one. Steiner held that the spiritual world can be researched in the right circumstances through direct experience, by persons practicing rigorous forms of ethical and cognitive self-discipline. Steiner described many exercises he said were suited to strengthening such self-discipline; the most complete exposition of these is found in his book How To Know Higher Worlds. The aim of these exercises is to develop higher levels of consciousness through meditation and observation. Details about the spiritual world, Steiner suggested, could on such a basis be discovered and reported, though no more infallibly than the results of natural science.

Steiner regarded his research reports as being important aids to others seeking to enter into spiritual experience. He suggested that a combination of spiritual exercises (for example, concentrating on an object such as a seed), moral development (control of thought, feelings and will combined with openness, tolerance and flexibility) and familiarity with other spiritual researchers' results would best further an individual's spiritual development. He consistently emphasised that any inner, spiritual practice should be undertaken in such a way as not to interfere with one's responsibilities in outer life. Steiner distinguished between what he considered were true and false paths of spiritual investigation.

In anthroposophy, artistic expression is also treated as a potentially valuable bridge between spiritual and material reality.

Prerequisites to and stages of inner development

Steiner's stated prerequisites to beginning on a spiritual path include a willingness to take up serious cognitive studies, a respect for factual evidence, and a responsible attitude. Central to progress on the path itself is a harmonious cultivation of the following qualities:
 Control over one's own thinking
 Control over one's will
 Composure
 Positivity
 Impartiality

Steiner sees meditation as a concentration and enhancement of the power of thought. By focusing consciously on an idea, feeling or intention the meditant seeks to arrive at pure thinking, a state exemplified by but not confined to pure mathematics. In Steiner's view, conventional sensory-material knowledge is achieved through relating perception and concepts. The anthroposophic path of esoteric training articulates three further stages of supersensory knowledge, which do not necessarily follow strictly sequentially in any single individual's spiritual progress.Stein, W. J., Die moderne naturwissenschaftliche Vorstellungsart und die Weltanschauung Goethes, wie sie Rudolf Steiner vertritt, reprinted in Meyer, Thomas, W.J. Stein / Rudolf Steiner, pp. 267–75; 256–7.
 By focusing on symbolic patterns, images, and poetic mantras, the meditant can achieve consciously directed Imaginations that allow sensory phenomena to appear as the expression of underlying beings of a soul-spiritual nature.
 By transcending such imaginative pictures, the meditant can become conscious of the meditative activity itself, which leads to experiences of expressions of soul-spiritual beings unmediated by sensory phenomena or qualities.  Steiner calls this stage Inspiration.
 By intensifying the will-forces through exercises such as a chronologically reversed review of the day's events, the meditant can achieve a further stage of inner independence from sensory experience, leading to direct contact, and even union, with spiritual beings ("Intuition") without loss of individual awareness.

Spiritual exercises

Steiner described numerous exercises he believed would bring spiritual development; other anthroposophists have added many others. A central principle is that "for every step in spiritual perception, three steps are to be taken in moral development." According to Steiner, moral development reveals the extent to which one has achieved control over one's inner life and can exercise it in harmony with the spiritual life of other people; it shows the real progress in spiritual development, the fruits of which are given in spiritual perception. It also guarantees the capacity to distinguish between false perceptions or illusions (which are possible in perceptions of both the outer world and the inner world) and true perceptions: i.e., the capacity to distinguish in any perception between the influence of subjective elements (i.e., viewpoint) and objective reality.

Place in Western philosophy
Steiner built upon Goethe's conception of an imaginative power capable of synthesizing the sense-perceptible form of a thing (an image of its outer appearance) and the concept we have of that thing (an image of its inner structure or nature). Steiner added to this the conception that a further step in the development of thinking is possible when the thinker observes his or her own thought processes. "The organ of observation and the observed thought process are then identical, so that the condition thus arrived at is simultaneously one of perception through thinking and one of thought through perception."

Thus, in Steiner's view, we can overcome the subject-object divide through inner activity, even though all human experience begins by being conditioned by it. In this connection, Steiner examines the step from thinking determined by outer impressions to what he calls sense-free thinking. He characterizes thoughts he considers without sensory content, such as mathematical or logical thoughts, as free deeds. Steiner believed he had thus located the origin of free will in our thinking, and in particular in sense-free thinking.

Some of the epistemic basis for Steiner's later anthroposophical work is contained in the seminal work, Philosophy of Freedom. In his early works, Steiner sought to overcome what he perceived as the dualism of Cartesian idealism and Kantian subjectivism by developing Goethe's conception of the human being as a natural-supernatural entity, that is: natural in that humanity is a product of nature, supernatural in that through our conceptual powers we extend nature's realm, allowing it to achieve a reflective capacity in us as philosophy, art and science. Steiner was one of the first European philosophers to overcome the subject-object split in Western thought. Though not well known among philosophers, his philosophical work was taken up by Owen Barfield (and through him influenced the Inklings, an Oxford group of Christian writers that included J. R. R. Tolkien and C. S. Lewis).

Christian and Jewish mystical thought have also influenced the development of anthroposophy.Paddock, F. and Spiegler, M., Judaism and Anthroposophy, 2003

Union of science and spirit
Steiner believed in the possibility of applying the clarity of scientific thinking to spiritual experience, which he saw as deriving from an objectively existing spiritual world. Steiner identified mathematics, which attains certainty through thinking itself, thus through inner experience rather than empirical observation, as the basis of his epistemology of spiritual experience.

Relationship to religion

Christ as the center of earthly evolution
Steiner's writing, though appreciative of all religions and cultural developments, emphasizes Western tradition as having evolved to meet contemporary needs. He describes Christ and his mission on earth of bringing individuated consciousness as having a particularly important place in human evolution, whereby:
Christianity has evolved out of previous religions;
The being which manifests in Christianity also manifests in all faiths and religions, and each religion is valid and true for the time and cultural context in which it was born;
All historical forms of Christianity need to be transformed considerably to meet the continuing evolution of humanity.

Thus, anthroposophy considers there to be a being who unifies all religions, and who is not represented by any particular religious faith. This being is, according to Steiner, not only the Redeemer of the Fall from Paradise, but also the unique pivot and meaning of earth's evolutionary processes and of human history. To describe this being, Steiner periodically used terms such as the "Representative of Humanity" or the "good spirit" rather than any denominational term.

Divergence from conventional Christian thought
Steiner's views of Christianity diverge from conventional Christian thought in key places, and include gnostic elements:

 One central point of divergence is Steiner's views on reincarnation and karma.
 Steiner differentiated three contemporary paths by which he believed it possible to arrive at Christ:
 Through heart-felt experiences of the Gospels; Steiner described this as the historically dominant path, but becoming less important in the future.
 Through inner experiences of a spiritual reality; this Steiner regarded as increasingly the path of spiritual or religious seekers today.
 Through initiatory experiences whereby the reality of Christ's death and resurrection are experienced; Steiner believed this is the path people will increasingly take.
 Steiner also believed that there were two different Jesus children involved in the Incarnation of the Christ: one child descended from Solomon, as described in the Gospel of Matthew, the other child from Nathan, as described in the Gospel of Luke. (The genealogies given in the two gospels diverge some thirty generations before Jesus' birth, and 'Jesus' was a common name in biblical times.)
 His view of the second coming of Christ is also unusual; he suggested that this would not be a physical reappearance, but that the Christ being would become manifest in non-physical form, visible to spiritual vision and apparent in community life for increasing numbers of people beginning around the year 1933.
 He emphasized his belief that in the future humanity would need to be able to recognize the Spirit of Love in all its genuine forms, regardless of what name would be used to describe this being. He also warned that the traditional name of the Christ might be misused, and the true essence of this being of love ignored.

According to Jane Gilmer, "Jung and Steiner were both versed in ancient gnosis and both envisioned a paradigmatic shift in the way it was delivered."

As Gilles Quispel put it, "After all, Theosophy is a pagan, Anthroposophy a Christian form of modern Gnosis."

Maria Carlson stated "Theosophy and Anthroposophy are fundamentally Gnostic systems in that they posit the dualism of Spirit and Matter."

R. McL. Wilson in The Oxford Companion to the Bible agrees that Steiner and Anthroposophy are under the influence of gnosticism.

Judaism
Rudolf Steiner wrote and lectured on Judaism and Jewish issues over much of his adult life. He was a fierce opponent of popular antisemitism, but asserted that there was no justification for the existence of Judaism and Jewish culture in the modern world, a radical assimilationist perspective which saw the Jews completely integrating into the larger society.Peter Staudenmeier, "Rudolf Steiner and the Jewish Question" , Leo Baeck Institute Yearbook, Vol. 50, No. 1 (2005): 127-147. He also supported Émile Zola's position in the Dreyfus affair. Steiner emphasized Judaism's central importance to the constitution of the modern era in the West but suggested that to appreciate the spirituality of the future it would need to overcome its tendency toward abstraction.

The publication comprised a conspiracy theory according to whom World War I was a consequence of a collusion of Freemasons and Jews - still favorite scapegoats of the conspiracy theorists - their purpose being the destruction of Germany. The writing was later enthusiastically received by the Nazi Party. According to Dick Taverne Steiner was a Nazi (i.e. a member of the NSDAP).

In his later life, Steiner was accused by the Nazis of being a Jew, and Adolf Hitler called anthroposophy "Jewish methods". The anthroposophical institutions in Germany were banned during Nazi rule and several anthroposophists sent to concentration camps.Lorenzo Ravagli, Unter Hammer und Hakenkreuz: Der völkisch-nationalsozialistische Kampf gegen die Anthroposophie, Verlag Freies Geistesleben, 

Important early anthroposophists who were Jewish included two central members on the executive boards of the precursors to the modern Anthroposophical Society, and Karl König, the founder of the Camphill movement, who had converted to Christianity. Martin Buber and Hugo Bergmann, who viewed Steiner's social ideas as a solution to the Arab–Jewish conflict, were also influenced by anthroposophy.

There are numerous anthroposophical organisations in Israel, including the anthroposophical kibbutz Harduf, founded by Jesaiah Ben-Aharon, forty Waldorf kindergartens and seventeen Waldorf schools (stand as of 2018). A number of these organizations are striving to foster positive relationships between the Arab and Jewish populations: The Harduf Waldorf school includes both Jewish and Arab faculty and students, and has extensive contact with the surrounding Arab communities, while the first joint Arab-Jewish kindergarten was a Waldorf program in Hilf near Haifa.

Christian Community

Towards the end of Steiner's life, a group of theology students (primarily Lutheran, with some Roman Catholic members) approached Steiner for help in reviving Christianity, in particular "to bridge the widening gulf between modern science and the world of spirit". They approached a notable Lutheran pastor, Friedrich Rittelmeyer, who was already working with Steiner's ideas, to join their efforts. Out of their co-operative endeavor, the Movement for Religious Renewal, now generally known as The Christian Community, was born. Steiner emphasized that he considered this movement, and his role in creating it, to be independent of his anthroposophical work, as he wished anthroposophy to be independent of any particular religion or religious denomination.

Reception

Anthroposophy's supporters include Saul Bellow, Selma Lagerlöf, Andrei Bely, Joseph Beuys, Owen Barfield, architect Walter Burley Griffin, Wassily Kandinsky, Andrei Tarkovsky, Bruno Walter, Right Livelihood Award winners Sir George Trevelyan, and Ibrahim Abouleish, and child psychiatrist Eva Frommer.Fiona Subotsky, Eva Frommer (Obituary) , 29 April 2005.  

The historian of religion Olav Hammer has termed anthroposophy "the most important esoteric society in European history." However authors, scientists, and physicians including Michael Shermer, Michael Ruse, Edzard Ernst, David Gorski, and Simon Singh have criticized anthroposophy's application in the areas of medicine, biology, agriculture, and education to be dangerous and pseudoscientific. Others including former Waldorf pupil Dan Dugan and historian Geoffrey Ahern have criticized anthroposophy itself as a dangerous quasi-religious movement that is fundamentally anti-rational and anti-scientific.

Scientific basis
Though Rudolf Steiner studied natural science at the Vienna Technical University at the undergraduate level, his doctorate was in epistemology and very little of his work is directly concerned with the empirical sciences. In his mature work, when he did refer to science it was often to present phenomenological or Goethean science as an alternative to what he considered the materialistic science of his contemporaries.

Steiner's primary interest was in applying the methodology of science to realms of inner experience and the spiritual worlds (his appreciation that the essence of science is its method of inquiry is unusual among esotericists), and Steiner called anthroposophy Geisteswissenschaft'' (science of the mind, cultural/spiritual science), a term generally used in German to refer to the humanities and social sciences.

Whether this is a sufficient basis for anthroposophy to be considered a spiritual science has been a matter of controversy. As Freda Easton explained in her study of Waldorf schools, "Whether one accepts anthroposophy as a science depends upon whether one accepts Steiner's interpretation of a science that extends the consciousness and capacity of human beings to experience their inner spiritual world."

Sven Ove Hansson has disputed anthroposophy's claim to a scientific basis, stating that its ideas are not empirically derived and neither reproducible nor testable. Carlo Willmann points out that as, on its own terms, anthroposophical methodology offers no possibility of being falsified except through its own procedures of spiritual investigation, no intersubjective validation is possible by conventional scientific methods; it thus cannot stand up to empiricist critics. Peter Schneider describes such objections as untenable, asserting that if a non-sensory, non-physical realm exists, then according to Steiner the experiences of pure thinking possible within the normal realm of consciousness would already be experiences of that, and it would be impossible to exclude the possibility of empirically grounded experiences of other supersensory content.

Olav Hammer suggests that anthroposophy carries scientism "to lengths unparalleled in any other Esoteric position" due to its dependence upon claims of clairvoyant experience, its subsuming natural science under "spiritual science." Hammer also asserts that the development of what she calls "fringe" sciences such as anthroposophic medicine and biodynamic agriculture are justified partly on the basis of the ethical and ecological values they promote, rather than purely on a scientific basis.

Though Steiner saw that spiritual vision itself is difficult for others to achieve, he recommended open-mindedly exploring and rationally testing the results of such research; he also urged others to follow a spiritual training that would allow them directly to apply his methods to achieve comparable results.

Anthony Storr stated about Rudolf Steiner's Anthroposophy: "His belief system is so eccentric, so unsupported by evidence, so manifestly bizarre, that rational skeptics are bound to consider it delusional...  But, whereas Einstein's way of perceiving the world by thought became confirmed by experiment and mathematical proof, Steiner's remained intensely subjective and insusceptible of objective confirmation."

According to Dan Dugan, Steiner was a champion of the following pseudoscientific claims, also championed by Waldorf schools:

wrong color theory;
obtuse criticism of the theory of relativity;
weird ideas about motions of the planets;
supporting vitalism;
doubting germ theory;
weird approach to physiological systems;
"the heart is not a pump".

Religious nature
As an explicitly spiritual movement, anthroposophy has sometimes been called a religious philosophy. In 1998 People for Legal and Non-Sectarian Schools (PLANS) started a lawsuit alleging that anthroposophy is a religion for Establishment Clause purposes and therefore several California school districts  should not be chartering Waldorf schools; the lawsuit was dismissed in 2012 for failure to show anthroposophy was a religion.  In 2000, a French court ruled that a government minister's description of anthroposophy as a cult was defamatory.

The teachings of Anthroposophy are essentially Christian Gnosticism. Indeed, according to the official stance of the Catholic Church, Anthroposophy is "a neognostic heresy". Other heresiologists agree. The Lutheran (Missouri Sinod) apologist and heresiologist Eldon K. Winker said that Steiner had the same Christology as Cerinthus.

Statements on race
Some anthroposophical ideas challenged the National Socialist racialist and nationalistic agenda. In contrast, some American educators have criticized Waldorf schools for failing to equally include the fables and myths of all cultures, instead favoring European stories over African ones.

 From the mid-1930s on, National Socialist ideologues attacked the anthroposophical worldview as being opposed to Nazi racist and nationalistic principles; anthroposophy considered "Blood, Race and Folk" as primitive instincts that must be overcome.
 An academic analysis of the educational approach in public schools noted that "[A] naive version of the evolution of consciousness, a theory foundational to both Steiner's anthroposophy and Waldorf education, sometimes places one race below another in one or another dimension of development. It is easy to imagine why there are disputes [...] about Waldorf educators' insisting on teaching Norse tales and Greek myths to the exclusion of African modes of discourse."

In response to such critiques, the Anthroposophical Society in America published in 1998  a statement clarifying its stance:
We explicitly reject any racial theory that may be construed to be part of Rudolf Steiner's writings. The Anthroposophical Society in America is an open, public society and it rejects any purported spiritual or scientific theory on the basis of which the alleged superiority of one race is justified at the expense of another race.

Tommy Wieringa, a Dutch writer who grew among Anthroposophists, commenting upon an essay by the Anthroposophist , he wrote "It was a meeting of old acquaintances: Nazi leaders such as Rudolf Hess and Heinrich Himmler already recognized a kindred spirit in Rudolf Steiner, with his theories about racial purity, esoteric medicine and biodynamic agriculture."

The racism of Anthroposophy is spiritual and paternalistic (i.e. benevolent), while the racism of fascism is materialistic and often malign. Olav Hammer, university professor expert in new religious movements and Western esotericism, confirms that now the racist and anti-Semitic character of Steiner's teachings can no longer be denied, even if that is "spiritual racism".

See also

 Esotericism in Germany and Austria
 Pneumatosophy
 Spiritual but not religious

References

External links

 Rudolf Steiner Archive (Steiner's works online)
 Steiner's complete works in German
 Rudolf Steiner Handbook (PDF; 56 MB)
 Goetheanum

Societies
 General Anthroposophical Society
 Anthroposophical Society in America
 Anthroposophical Society in Great Britain 
 Anthroposophical Initiatives in India
 Anthroposophical Society in Australia
 Anthroposophical Society in New Zealand

 
Esoteric Christianity
Esoteric schools of thought
Rudolf Steiner
Spirituality